The 2019–20 Ural season was the club's seventh successive season that the club played in the Russian Premier League, the highest tier of association football in Russia.

Season review
On 17 March, the Russian Premier League postponed all league fixtures until April 10 due to the COVID-19 pandemic.

On 1 April, the Russian Football Union extended the suspension of football until 31 May.

On 15 May, the Russian Football Union announced that the Russian Premier League season would resume on 21 June.

On 1 July, the Russian Premier League announced that that afternoon's game between Orenburg and Ural Yekaterinburg had been called off due to an outbreak of COVID-19 within the Orenburg squad.

Squad

Out on loan

Transfers

In

Loans in

Out

Loans out

Released

Friendlies

Competitions

Premier League

Results by round

Results

League table

Russian Cup

Squad statistics

Appearances and goals

|-
|colspan="14"|Players away from the club on loan:
|-
|colspan="14"|Players who appeared for Ural Yekaterinburg but left during the season:

|}

Goal scorers

Clean sheets

Disciplinary record

References

External links

FC Ural Yekaterinburg seasons
Ural Yekaterinburg